Însurăței (formerly known as Pârdăleni) is a town located in Brăila County, Muntenia, Romania. The town administers three villages: Lacu Rezii, Măru Roșu and Valea Călmățuiului. The latter was called Rubla during Communist rule and housed political offenders who were obliged to live there. It officially became a town in 1989, as a result of the Romanian rural systematization program.

Natives
 Gheorghe Moldoveanu (b. 1945), rower

References

Populated places in Brăila County
Localities in Muntenia
Towns in Romania